Leech Lake (translated from the Ojibwe language Gaa-zagaskwaajimekaag: Lake abundant with bloodsuckers) is a lake located in north central Minnesota, United States. It is southeast of  Bemidji, located mainly within the Leech Lake Indian Reservation, and completely within the Chippewa National Forest. It is used as a reservoir.

Hydrology

Leech Lake outlets to the Leech Lake River, which flows into the Mississippi River. The sole outlet to the Leech Lake River is controlled by a dam in order to regulate water levels of the lake. Leech Lake has seven major inlets that include Portage Lake Creek, Sucker Creek, Steamboat River, Benedict River, Shingobee River, Bishop Creek, and the Boy River. There are also nine minor inlets that flow into Leech Lake.

Islands
Leech Lake hosts eleven islands that cover a total of 1,617 acres of land. 160 sq miles

The following list is in order from largest to smallest.
 Bear Island
 Minnesota Island
 Pelican Island
 Headquarters Bay Island
 Big Pipe Island
 Goose Island
 Bog (Duck) Island
 Narrows Island
 Little Bear Island
 Little Pelican Island
 Gull Island
 Shingobee Island

The long, narrow Shingobee Bay is part of Leech Lake, and is located on its southern end.  Shingobee Bay, and the adjacent Walker Bay, boast some of the deepest parts in the entire lake.

Ecology

Invasive species
 Lythrum salicaria
Also known as purple loosestrife. This is an invasive plant that takes over lake shores and marshes, replacing cattails and other native wetland plants. Purple loosestrife doesn't provide a sufficient food source, nesting area, or cover for the native animals.  Also one plant can produce around two million seeds annually, and it spreads rapidly through aquatic systems.

 Typha angustifolia
Better known as the narrow-leaf cattail, this invasive plant is able to grow in deeper water (compared to its native counterparts). The narrow-leaf cattail competes with the native Typha latifolia (broad leaf cattail) and other native plants along Leech Lake.

Aquatic life
Leech Lake is a popular sport fishing hotspot, and is fished for many different types. The state record lake whitefish (12 lb, 4.5 oz) and pumpkinseed (1 lb, 5.6 oz) were both caught here in 1999.

Species of fish the lake contains:
 Black crappie
 Bowfin (dog fish) 
 Bluegill
 Brown bullhead
 Catfish
 Eelpout
 Hybrid sunfish
 Largemouth bass
 Muskellunge 
 Northern pike
 Pumpkinseed
 Rock bass
 Smallmouth bass
 Tullibee (cisco)
 Walleye
 White sucker
 Yellow bullhead
 Yellow perch
 Jackfish

Vegetation
Wild rice 
Grows in the shallow depths of Leech Lake, emerging through over 4,000 acres of water. Wild Rice is a valuable crop for the Leech Lake community.
Bulrush
Grass like plants that grow in water, they can reach lengths of around ten feet. These plants are an important food resources for aquatic life in Leech Lake.

Eagles

Leech Lake and the surrounding national forest is home to a large population of bald eagles. They are known to return to their same nests when mature. Populations have risen over the last few decades.

History

On early maps, Leech Lake is identified in French as "lac Sangsue" (Bloodsucker Lake), which was then translated into English to its current name; its French name was translated from the Ojibwe "Ozagaskwaajimekaag-zaaga'igan" (lake abundant with bloodsuckers).

In 1855, the Leech Lake Indian Reservation was established on the south shore of Leech Lake, along with two other Indian Reservations in the area, which along with two additional Indian Reservations, the five Indian Reservations were amalgamated in 1936 to form the current "Greater" Leech Lake Indian Reservation which encompasses most all of Leech Lake.

On October 5, 1898, Leech Lake was the location of a conflict between Ojibwe and Federal troops of the United States, the Battle of Sugar Point. A firefight broke out between the 3rd U.S. Infantry Regiment and the Leech Lake Band of Ojibwe after one of the soldiers sent to retrieve a bootlegger mistakenly fired his rifle. Oscar Burkard received the Medal of Honor on August 21, 1899 for his participation in the battle.

In the summer of 1955, Leech Lake became famous for its musky fishing, as the "Leech Lake Musky Rampage" thrust it into the spotlight when hundreds of muskies were caught in a two-week period in July.

Economy

Recreational/leisure use
Every February, Leech Lake is home to the International Eelpout Festival. The eelpout, also known as the Burbot, is rarely seen in Leech Lake, except in the winter when it is very plentiful. Events include a black-tie dinner, ice bowling, and a contest to see who can catch the largest eelpout.

Towns

 Ah-Gwah-Ching
 Baker
 Brevik
 Federal Dam
 Leech Lake Township
 Onigum
 Remer
 Whipholt
 Walker

References

External links
DNR leech lake info
Leech Lake Tourism Bureau
Fishing leech lake
Historic American Engineering Record (HAER) documentation:
 about six lakes including this one

Historic American Engineering Record in Minnesota
 
Lakes of Cass County, Minnesota
Lakes of Minnesota